Ray Petri (16 September 1948–August 1989)  was a fashion stylist and creator of the fashion house, Buffalo.

Born  Ray Petrie in Dundee, Scotland, Petri moved to Brisbane, Australia with his family at age 15. In 1969, feeling Australia was too provincial, he moved to London where he ran a jewellery booth at the Camden Street antiques market. He loved reggae and styled Freddie McGregor. Between 1983 and 1989, Petri worked as a freelance with style magazines The Face, i-D and Arena. He collaborated with stylist Mitzi Lorenz and photographers Jamie Morgan, Martin Brading, Roger Charity, Marc Lebon and Norman Watson to evolve the Buffalo Boy series of fashion spreads. During his career, he also worked with designers Jean Paul Gaultier and Giorgio Armani.

Petri's death, in August 1989 at the age of 40, was AIDS-related.

Further reading

References

1948 births
1989 deaths
Scottish fashion designers
Scottish emigrants to Australia
AIDS-related deaths in England
Fashion stylists
People from Dundee
LGBT fashion designers
20th-century Scottish LGBT people